Gideon J. Carpenter (May 4, 1823 - May 6, 1910) was a Democratic politician who served in the California State Senate and Assembly, also serving as the Speaker of the Assembly between 1875 and 1876. He was also the county clerk and district attorney of El Dorado County.

Life 

Carpenter was born in Harford, Pennsylvania in 1823 and is the younger brother of future Governor of Iowa and Congressman Cyrus C. Carpenter. He moved to California in 1850 and became a miner in the Big Bar area of the Middle Fork American River but later shifted his focus to practicing law and being involved in politics.

Political Career 

Carpenter was elected to the California State Senate from the 18th district in 1856 and served until 1860. He was then county clerk and district attorney of El Dorado County in California during the 1860s. Carpenter returned to the state legislature when he was elected to the California State Assembly from the 23rd district in 1875, and was elected Speaker of the Assembly in the same year. After leaving the legislature in 1878 he was a reporter for the California Supreme Court until 1880.

Later life 

In 1889, Carpenter purchased the Placerville Mountain Democrat, a newspaper, alongside George E. Williams and eventually became the sole owner in 1891. Carpenter's son died in 1902, and Carpenter himself died in 1910 in Placerville.

References 

1823 births
1910 deaths
Speakers of the California State Assembly